Christopher Janney (born 1950) is an American composer, artist, and architect known for his work on the interrelation of architecture and music. Sometimes he attempts to make architecture more like music as in his sound sculptures titled "Urban Musical Instruments", of which "Soundstair" (musical stairs) and "Sonic Forest" are examples. Other times, he develops performance projects which make music more like architecture as in his "Physical Music" series which includes "HeartBeat," a piece danced by Mikhail Baryshnikov. Much of Janney's permanent work has sought to create "permanent participatory soundworks for public spaces," including installations for airports in Dallas, Boston, Miami and Sacramento, Atlanta and the New York City Subway.

Janney has toured his "Sonic Forest" in both the US and Europe, at major music festivals including Bonnaroo and Coachella, as well as Glastonbury and Hyde Park Calling in the UK.

In 2014, Janney created an evening-length concert at the Gramercy Theater/NYC titled "Exploring the Hidden Music." He created new versions of his "Visual Music Project", "HeartBeat", and his quadraphonic sound installation, "CyberMonks." Additional performers included bassist/producer Bill Laswell (B. Eno, D. Byrne, H. Hancock), percussionist Sheila E. (Santana, Prince), tabla/drummer Trilok Gurtu (J.Zawinul, J. McLaughlin), singer Lynn Mabry (Brides of Funkenstein), Dave Revels (Persuasions) and choreographer Sara Rudner (Twyla Tharp 
Dance).

A book on his work, titled Architecture of the Air, was released in February, 2007.

He currently lives in Lexington, Massachusetts.

Biography
Janney grew up in Washington, D.C. He received a B.A. degree (1973, magna cum laude) from Princeton University (where he studied with Michael Graves, James Seawright and Rosalind Krauss). After graduation, he studied percussion and music at the Dalcroze School of Music (see Eurhythmics) and Mannes College of Music in New York, performed jazz and worked with various artists and dance companies (including Merce Cunningham Dance and Sara Rudner 18th St. Company, Jack Youngerman, Claes Oldenburg).

He received an MS (1978) in Environmental Art at the Massachusetts Institute of Technology; his thesis (under Otto Piene) was titled SOUNDSTAIR: The Nature of Environmental/Participatory Art.

While also a Research Fellow at MIT, Janney developed his own multi-media studio, PhenomenArts, Inc., in 1980, combining his interests in music and architecture. He has created numerous permanent interactive sound/light installations and performances, including Harmonic Runway at the Miami Airport and REACH:NY, 34th St. Subway in New York, HeartBeat:mb with Sara Rudner and Mikhail Baryshnikov, and "Soundstair" (musical stairs), most recently at the Boston Children's Hospital.

Janney lectures widely on his work. He has been a visiting professor at both The Cooper Union School of Architecture and Pratt Institute School of Architecture, where he has taught his seminar "Sound as a Visual Medium".

He currently serves as Vice-President for the Institute for Performance Sculpture, Inc. and is President/Artistic Director for PhenomenArts, Inc which specializes in Environmental Arts and Design with studios in Lexington, MA and London, UK.

Urban musical instruments 

Janney has created a number of temporary and permanent installations in the US and Europe titled “Urban Musical Instruments.” A good example of this work is "Sonic Forest" consisting of 8 ft. tall by 10" diameter cylindrical aluminum columns, placed in site-specific patterns. Each column contains a series of photo-sensors, audio speaker, LED cone-light and star-strobe. By strolling among and touching the columns, people trigger the photo-sensors, activating the light and an ever-changing “sound score” of melodic tones, environmental sounds and text.

"Soundstair", a site-specific interactive light/sound installation, has toured throughout the US and Europe since 1980.

SoundStair: The Nature of Environmental/Participatory Art
The original installation, his MIT thesis, Soundstair ©1978, is a permanent piece in the Boston Museum of Science.

Other permanent locations of Soundstair (the musical stairs):

"Soundstair: Minnesota" - Science Museum of Minnesota, St. Paul, MN
"Soundstair: Macon" - Macon Museum of Arts and Sciences, Macon, GA
"Soundstair: Charleston" - South Carolina Aquarium, Charleston, SC
"Soundstair: CHB" - Children's Hospital Boston, Boston, MA

Other major projects
"Harmonic Runway" - Miami Airport, 1995
"REACH:New York" - 34th St. Subway, New York, NY, 1997
"Turn Up The Heat" - an interactive scoreboard for the Miami Arena, Miami, FL, 2000
"A House Is a Musical instrument" - Kona, Hawaii, 2000
"Whistle Grove: The National Steamboat Monument" - Cincinnati, OH, 2002
"Harmonic Convergence" - Miami Airport, 2011
"Harmonic Fugue" - Hendrix College, Conway, Arkansas, 2011
"Sonic Fireflies" - REVEL Resorts, Atlantic City, NJ, 2012
"Light Waves: Atlanta" - Atlanta Airport, Atlanta, GA, 2012

See also
 Environmental art
 Environmental sculpture
 Sound art

Reference works
 Christopher Janney, Ellen Lampert-Greaux, Beth Dunlop, Sir George Martin (Foreword); Architecture of the Air: The Sound and Light Environments of Christopher Janney; New York: Sideshow Media, 1997.  

1950 births
Living people
American contemporary artists
Princeton University alumni
American sound artists